Ethiopia competed at the 1980 Summer Paralympics in Arnhem, Netherlands. 1 competitor from Ethiopia won no medals and so did not place in the medal table.

See also 
 Ethiopia at the Paralympics
 Ethiopia at the 1980 Summer Olympics

References 

Ethiopia at the Paralympics
Nations at the 1980 Summer Paralympics